"Hot & Wet" is the second single released from 112's 2003 album, Hot & Wet. Slim sings lead and the song features rapper, Ludacris and was produced by Stevie J.

Track listing
"Hot & Wet" (featuring Ludacris) — 3:42
"Na Na Na Na" (featuring Super Cat) — 3:43

Charts

Weekly charts

References

2003 singles
2003 songs
112 (band) songs
Ludacris songs
Bad Boy Records singles
Songs written by Sean Combs
Songs written by Ludacris
Songs written by Daron Jones
Songs written by Stevie J
Songs written by Quinnes Parker
Songs written by Slim (singer)